Plamen Milushev ((born 6 August 1994) is a Bulgarian professional tennis player.

Milushev has a career high ATP singles ranking of No. 955 achieved on 8 December 2014, whilst his best doubles ranking is No. 966 achieved on 17 December 2018.

Milushev made his ATP main draw debut at the 2021 Sofia Open after entering the doubles main draw as an alternate with Radoslav Shandarov.

Year-end ATP ranking

Challenger and Futures/World Tennis Tour Finals

Doubles: 4 (1–3)

References

External links
 
 

1994 births
Living people
Bulgarian male tennis players
Sportspeople from Sofia
21st-century Bulgarian people